Pepperton is an unincorporated community in Butts County, in the U.S. state of Georgia.

History
Pepperton was named for a red pepper patch near the original town site. The Georgia General Assembly incorporated Pepperton as a town in 1897.

Much of the community was annexed by Jackson in 1966.

References

Unincorporated communities in Butts County, Georgia
Unincorporated communities in Georgia (U.S. state)